Marzieh Hashemi (born as Melanie Franklin) is an American-born Iranian journalist and television presenter. She is a natural-born citizen of the United States and a naturalized citizen of Iran. Hashemi is employed by Press TV, the Iranian state-owned news and documentary television network.

On January 15, 2019, Hashemi was arrested by the FBI while boarding a St. Louis flight, to visit her children in Denver. According to court documents she was being held as a material witness in a federal investigation and had not been accused of any crime. Hashemi was released on 23 January 2019 after testifying before a federal grand jury in Washington D.C..

Biography 
Hashemi was born on 21 December 1959 in New Orleans, Louisiana, United States. She was born into a Christian African-American family. She was a student in the field of broadcasting in 1979, when the Iranian revolution happened, as a result of which she converted to Islam and began her career in Islamic newspapers and magazines in United States.

Since 2008, she has lived in Iran, where she is now a TV presenter, journalist, voice-over artist, documentarian and the host of Press TV, Iran's English-language broadcasting network.

She has said the main reason for her conversion was the Iranian revolution and the character of Ayatollah Khomeini.

She changed her name to Marzieh Hashemi after conversion; Hashemi is her Muslim husband’s last name and she chose Marzieh, a title of Fatimah bint Muhammad, the daughter of an Islamic Prophet. Hashemi was granted Iranian citizenship because her husband is Iranian..

Hashemi has been accused of antisemitism. She has stated that Jews control American media and that Zionists were behind the September 11 attacks.

Arrest in the United States (2019)

On 13 January 2019, Hasemi travelled to the United States to visit her family, particularly her ill brother. CNN reported she was traveling to visit her family and film a documentary about Black Lives Matter for Press TV.

Hashemi was arrested at the St. Louis Lambert International Airport in Missouri by federal agents and was being held in custody in Washington DC. The reason for her arrest was initially unknown, but according to subsequent court documents she was being held as a material witness for a federal investigation but "has not been accused of any crime". According to Reuters, a United States government source told them that a grand jury was examining whether Press TV failed to register as a foreign agent which would be required if it is a propaganda outlet. Following testimony before a federal grand jury in Washington D.C., Hashemi was released on 23 January 2019, and returned to Iran on 30 January 2019.

Iranian media said that, after 48 hours, she was allowed to make a call to inform her family. Press TV said Hashemi was denied halal food, offered only pork to eat (which is forbidden under Islamic law), and she had only eaten a packet of crackers since her detainment. Hashemi said that her hijab was forcibly removed and that she is only able to wear a short-sleeved shirt, again contrary to the requirements of her Muslim faith.  Hashemi had criticized US discrimination against veiled Muslim women in the past.

According to Adam Goldman of The New York Times, Hashemi is the "Individual A." cited in the unsealed indictment of Monica Witt, who is charged with espionage for Iran.

Reaction
 Foreign Minister Mohammad Javad Zarif described the arrest of Marzieh Hashemi by America as a "political game". He believes that this move is an unacceptable political act that tramples on freedom of speech.
  Peyman Jebelli, the head of Islamic Republic of Iran Broadcasting (IRIB)’s World Service, described the action a "blunder" and criticized her ill-treatment in US custody.
 The Islamic Human Rights Commission (IHRC) wrote to the UN Rapporteur on Arbitrary Detention with regard to Ms. Hashemi's imprisonment. IHRC condemned the journalist's arrest and "called for the widest media solidarity campaign" to help secure her release.
 After Marzieh Hashemi was arrested on 13 January 2019 in the United States and held in custody for 11 days without charge in Washington DC, protests were held in many international cities on January 25, to demand her release.

References

Living people
Press TV people
9/11 conspiracy theorists
Converts to Shia Islam from Christianity
People from New Orleans
American emigrants to Iran
Iranian journalists
Antisemitism in Iran
1959 births
Iranian people of African-American descent
Naturalized citizens of Iran
Converts to Islam from Protestantism
African-American people
African-American Shia Muslims
20th-century journalists
Iranian conspiracy theorists